Daisy Fowler Kennedy (16 January 1893 – 30 July 1981) was an Australian-born concert violinist.

She was born in Burra-Burra, 160 km north of Adelaide, to parents of Scottish and Irish descent. Her father, Joseph A. Kennedy, was headmaster of Glenelg Primary School and president of the South Australian Public School Teachers' Union. For three years, she was Elder scholar at the Adelaide Conservatory under Mrs. Alderman and Hermann Heinicke. She was a private pupil of Otakar Ševčík in Vienna for a year, and then studied for two years in the Meister-Schule there. She appeared in London in 1911 and toured widely in Europe and in the United States, Australia and New Zealand.

On 15 April 1914, she married the Russian pianist Benno Moiseiwitsch; their daughter, the theatre designer Tanya Moiseiwitsch, was born in December the same year. They had a second daughter, Sandra. After divorcing Moiseiwitsch, she married the English playwright and poet John Drinkwater. They had a daughter, Penny Drinkwater, who went on to become a wine writer and member of the circle of wine writers.

She was a cousin of cellist Lauri Kennedy, and thus also related to Lauri's son John Kennedy, another cellist, and grandson, the violinist Nigel Kennedy.

References 

1893 births
1981 deaths
20th-century Australian musicians
20th-century classical violinists
20th-century women musicians
Australian classical violinists
People from Burra, South Australia
Women classical violinists
Australian emigrants to England
Australian expatriates in England